John Roger Loxdale Highfield (14 February 1922 – 13 April 2017) was an English historian of medieval Europe and fellow of Merton College, University of Oxford. His contribution to the study of medieval Spain was recognised by his appointment to the Order of Isabella the Catholic in 1989.

Biography
Roger Highfield enjoyed a long career at Merton College Oxford which began in 1948 when he joined the college as a Harmsworth Senior Scholar. Prior to that he read history at Magdalen College, Oxford, where he was tutored by the influential historians A. J. P. Taylor and K. B. McFarlane. He also did military service in the Royal Artillery.

In 1951 he became Tutor in History at Merton, a post he kept until he retired in 1989, teaching alongside historians Robert Gildea and Philip Waller. He was also a colleague of J. R. R. Tolkien, for whom he had little respect, describing the author as “very lazy" and “the worst sub-warden ever”, adding that Tolkien-mania left him “baffled”. When champagne was ordered to mark Tolkien's donation to the College of his original manuscript of The Hobbit, Highfield remarked acidly: "waste of good champagne".
 
Highfield served as Merton's archivist for almost 40 years, as well as other College offices. In 1953 Highfield began a series of annual history reading weeks in Cornwall, open to all undergraduate historians, a tradition which continues today.

In 1997 he published the History of Merton College, which was jointly authored with the historian and archivist Geoffrey Martin, drawing heavily on documents from the College archives.

Highfield's scholarship focused on late medieval Spain, in recognition of which he was awarded the Order of Isabella the Catholic in 1989.

Selected publications

The Early Rolls of Merton College, Oxford; with an appendix of thirteenth-century Oxford charters. Oxford: Clarendon Press, 1964
Europe in the Late Middle Ages. London: Faber, 1970. (Edited with J. R. Hale & B. Smalley)
Spain in the Fifteenth Century, 1369-1516: essays and extracts by historians of Spain. London: Macmillan, 1972. (Editor) 
The Crown and Local Communities in England and France in the Fifteenth Century. London: Sutton, 1981. (Edited with Robin Jeffs) 
Oxford and Cambridge. Cambridge: Cambridge University Press, 1988. (With Christopher Brooke) 
A History of Merton College, Oxford. Oxford: Oxford University Press, 1997. (with G. H. Martin) 
Registrum annalium Collegii Mertonensis, 1603-1660. Woodbridge: Boydell Press/Oxford Historical Society, 2006.

See also
Karl Leyser
John Roberts

References

Further reading
Lomax, Derek W. & Mackenzie, David (eds.) (1989) God and Man in Medieval Spain: Essays in honour of J. R. L. Highfield. Warminster: Aris & Phillips. 

English historians
Historians of Spain
Fellows of Merton College, Oxford
Alumni of Magdalen College, Oxford
People from the City of Westminster
Recipients of the Order of Isabella the Catholic
People educated at Dulwich College
1922 births
2017 deaths
20th-century British Army personnel
Royal Artillery personnel